The 1981 Daytona 500, the 23rd running of the event, was a NASCAR Winston Cup Series race held at the Daytona International Speedway in Daytona Beach, Florida. It was held on Sunday, February 15, 1981.

Race report
Contested over 200 laps and over the course of 2 hours and 56 minutes, the race was won by Richard Petty for his record seventh at the Daytona 500, beating Bobby Allison to the line by 3.5 seconds and bringing about Buick's first win in NASCAR since 1956. Ricky Rudd, Buddy Baker, and Dale Earnhardt rounded out the Top 5.

David Pearson had the only Chevrolet in the field. He started 9th in his new Monte Carlo after finishing 5th in the Twin 125 before retiring with engine failure.   Steve Moore attempted to qualify in a Chevrolet Malibu but his #73 didn't make the race. 

Bobby Allison dominated Speedweeks from the beginning, winning the pole position, his 125-mile qualifying race, and was considered the prohibitive favorite for the 500. He was driving a 1981 Pontiac Le Mans, which was the only car in the race with a "fastback" sloped rear window, greatly improving aerodynamics and downforce on the rear spoiler over the "notchback" profiles of the Buick Regals, Pontiac Grand Prixs, Oldsmobile Cutlasses, and Ford Thunderbirds. The Le Mans was on the NASCAR approved-model list, but no other team thought to build one.

Allison led the most laps and was the car to beat. But Allison lost considerable time when he ran out of fuel and had to coast through most of a lap to make his final pit stop. Meanwhile, on Richard Petty's final planned pit stop, Petty's crew chief Dale Inman, who was working his final race with the team before leaving to become Dale Earnhardt's crew chief, opted not to change tires and only took on fuel. Petty then re-entered the track with a considerable lead that Allison rapidly closed, but could not overcome before the finish.

The race was contested in front of 130,000 spectators and featured 49 lead changes. 18 laps were run under the caution flag. It was one of the few Daytona 500s where the final caution flag occurred before the halfway point of the race.

Petty earned $90,575 ($ when adjusted for inflation) for winning, the largest purse of his entire career. Blackie Wangerin finished last after an accident on lap 17.

First Daytona 500 starts for Ronnie Sanders, Tim Richmond, Kyle Petty, and Billie Harvey. Only Daytona 500 starts for Glenn Jarrett and Don Sprouse. Last Daytona 500 starts for Johnny Rutherford, Bill Elswick, Don Whittington, James Hylton, Cecil Gordon, Bruce Hill, and Blackie Wangerin.

Dickie Boswell would make his only Cup Series attempt at this race.

Top 10 finishers

Post-race standings

References

External links
NASCAR.COM - Daytona Countdown: '81 - Jan 26, 2005

Daytona 500
Daytona 500
Daytona 500
NASCAR races at Daytona International Speedway